John Proctor (1520? – 1558/59) was an English politician.

He was a Member (MP) of the Parliament of England for Chippenham in November 1554.

References

1520 births
1550s deaths
English MPs 1554–1555